A Ghetto Lullaby is a live album by American saxophonist Jackie McLean recorded at the Jazzhus Montmartre in 1973 and released on the SteepleChase label.

Reception

The AllMusic review by Scott Yanow states, "the altoist's passionate solos and very distinctive sound uplift the music and make this an advanced hard bop set worth acquiring".

Track listing
 "Jack's Tune" (Jackie McLean) - 11:02
 "Mode for Jay Mac" (Billy Gault) - 9:08
 "Where Is Love?" (Lionel Bart) - 5:26
 "Callin'" (Kenny Drew) - 8:30
 "A Ghetto Lullaby" (Gault) - 7:14

Personnel
Jackie McLean – alto saxophone
Kenny Drew – piano
Niels-Henning Ørsted Pedersen – bass
Alex Riel – drums

References

SteepleChase Records live albums
Jackie McLean live albums
1974 live albums
Albums recorded at Jazzhus Montmartre